"Crazy on You" is a song by American rock band Heart from their debut studio album, Dreamboat Annie (1975). It was released in March 1976 as the album's third single in Canada and the album's debut single in the United States.  It reached the top 25 in Canada and the top 35 in the US. It found more success in the Netherlands and Belgium where it peaked at number 2 and 13, respectively, in early 1977 after its release as the second single from Dreamboat Annie in those countries. It is considered one of Heart's signature songs as it is one of the most played tracks on classic rock radio stations in the US.

Description
Starting with an acoustic guitar intro called "Silver Wheels", the song turns into a fast-paced rock song that was the band's signature sound in their early years. "Crazy on You" attracted attention both for the relatively unusual combination of an acoustic guitar paired with electric guitars and the fact that the acoustic guitarist was a woman – a rarity in rock music during that time. According to co-writer and guitarist Nancy Wilson, who discussed it on an episode of the radio program In the Studio with Redbeard that devoted an entire episode to the Dreamboat Annie album, the rapid acoustic rhythm part was inspired by The Moody Blues's 1970 song "Question". The guitar riff was created by Roger Fisher during recording sessions.

The song's lyrics tell of a person's desire to forget all the problems of the world during one night of passion. During an interview on the television series Private Sessions in 2007, Ann Wilson revealed the song was written in response to the stress caused by the Vietnam War and social unrest in the United States in the early 1970s.

The song was written while the band members were living in a small A-frame cottage in Point Roberts, Washington, situated on the Canada–United States border.

Release
Released in both Canada and the US in March 1976, "Crazy on You" peaked at number 25 on RPMs Top Singles chart in Canada in May of that year and at number 35 on the US Billboard Hot 100 the following month. It remains one of Heart's signature songs and is still a staple on North American classic rock radio stations.  The track received heavy airplay on FM Album-Oriented Rock stations, which drove sales of the parent album.

Chicago-based radio station WLS-AM, a current hit radio station where the song received heavy airplay, ranked "Crazy on You" as the 30th biggest song of 1976. It reached number three on the station's survey of August 7, 1976. After the success of "Crazy on You", "Magic Man" was released in the US and re-released in Canada, particularly in parts of Canada where it had not received much radio airplay before.

In the Netherlands, "Crazy on You" was released in February 1977 as the second single off Dreamboat Annie after "Magic Man" and rose to number 2 and 4 on the two charts in the country.
 It also ascended to number 13 in neighboring Belgium.

The single's original B-side, "Dreamboat Annie", was released on its own as an A-side in December 1976. The shortest version of "Dreamboat Annie" directly precedes "Crazy on You" on the original album and with little gap between the songs first-time listeners often think they are one continual epic song.

Mushroom Records re-released "Crazy on You" in late 1977 in both the US and Canada with the same catalog number and B-side. In February 1978, the re-release reached number 62 on the Billboard Hot 100 and number 68 on RPMs Top Singles chart. 

In 2013, the original lineup of the band performed the song for their induction into the Rock and Roll Hall of Fame, their first performance together in over 30 years. The current lineup of the band performed "Barracuda".

In popular culture

The song is prominently featured during pivotal scenes in Jean-Marc Vallée's 2015 film Demolition starring Jake Gyllenhaal and Naomi Watts. It was also featured in the films American Pop (1981), The Virgin Suicides (1999), Harold & Kumar Go to White Castle (2004) and  Captain Marvel (2019). A cover of the song is also included in the video game Guitar Hero 2 as a playable track, and the master recording is included in Rock Band 4 as paid downloadable content.

The song was also featured in the Close Enough episode "Room Parents" and in Fargo (TV series) season 3 ep 1 "Law of vacant places".

The song was featured in episode 5 of the Telltale game Guardians of the Galaxy.

Personnel
Adapted from the liner notes of Dreamboat Annie.

 Ann Wilson – lead vocals, flute, backing vocals
 Nancy Wilson – acoustic guitar, backing vocals
 Roger Fisher – electric guitar
 Howard Leese – electric guitar
 Steve Fossen – bass
 Kat Hendrikse – drums
 Rob Deans – synthesizer
 Geoff Foubert – backing vocals
 Tessie Bensussen – backing vocals
 Jim Hill – backing vocals
 Mike Flicker – production, engineering
 Howard Leese – production assistance
 Rolf Hennemann – engineering
 Patrick Collins – mastering

Charts

Weekly charts

Year-end charts

References

External links
 

1976 singles
1976 songs
Heart (band) songs
Mushroom Records singles
Songs of the Vietnam War
Songs written by Ann Wilson
Songs written by Nancy Wilson (rock musician)
Song recordings produced by Mike Flicker